The 600 nanometer process (600 nm process) is a level of semiconductor process technology that was reached in the 1994–1995 timeframe, by most leading semiconductor companies, like Intel and IBM.

Products featuring 0.6 µm manufacturing process
 Intel 80486DX4 CPU launched in 1994 was manufactured using this process.
 IBM/Motorola PowerPC 601, the first PowerPC chip, was produced in 0.6 µm.
 Intel Pentium CPUs at 75 MHz, 90 MHz and 100 MHz were also manufactured using this process.

References 

00600